San Lorenzo in Usella is a Roman Catholic church in Cantagallo, in Tuscany, Italy.

Historical Profile
The Parish is already documented in 997 as the Parish of San Lorenzo in Pisignano.

Original structure

The first church at the site likely had a single nave, similar to other romanesque-style parish churches nearby, such as  San Pietro in Figline and San Vito and Modesto a Sofignano and Hippolytus and Cassian Vernio

The present structure has a three-aisled result of renovations and changes starting with 20th-century belltower. The facade, erected in 1907, repeats the internal partition and is divided into three sectors: the central, much higher, and the lower side, the facade is set on the Renaissance proportions, and decorated with items that alluding to the Gothic and the Renaissance.

Interior

Original structure

For the interior the same principles apply comparative adopted for the exterior, the interior was still characterized by a single nave with exposed brick in hand were visible wooden beams.

Current status

Internally the church has the same capacity that characterizes the classical exterior; the nave, of three arches, is covered with vaults lowered (original 700), the aisles-made during the restoration of 1907 - have a flat roof.

References 

Churches in the province of Prato
20th-century Roman Catholic church buildings in Italy
Cantagallo, Tuscany